Jurangmangu Station (JMG) is a class III railway station located in Sawah Lama, Ciputat, South Tangerang. The station is located at the elevation of +25 metres above sea level, is included in the Operation Area I Jakarta. Even though it is called Jurangmangu, this station is not located in Jurangmangu Village, Pondok Aren District, but is located in the south of Jurangmangu village itself.

Jurangmangu is one of two stations serving the Bintaro housing area, along with Pondok Ranji, located about 2 kilometers northeast. It is also located near the Bintaro XChange mall.

Services
The following is a list of train services at the Jurangmangu Station.
KRL Commuterline

Intermodal support

References

External links

South Tangerang
Railway stations in Banten
Railway stations opened in 1889